Charles Glenn vonRosenberg (born July 11, 1947) is an American bishop in the Episcopal Church.

Biography 
VonRosenberg was born in Fayetteville, North Carolina, in 1947. He received his bachelor of arts degree from the University of North Carolina at Chapel Hill in 1969. He completed a master of divinity degree at Virginia Theological Seminary in 1974 and was ordained as a priest in 1975.

VonRosenberg served as canon to the ordinary (assistant to the bishop) of the Episcopal Diocese of Upper South Carolina from 1989 to 1994. Afterwards, he became rector of St. James Episcopal Church in Wilmington, North Carolina.

On February 27, 1999, vonRosenberg was consecrated as the third bishop of the Episcopal Diocese of East Tennessee, a diocese covering 34 counties in Tennessee and three in North Georgia, with 45 congregations and five worshiping communities and nearly 16,000 active members. He retired from that position in June 2011. On January 26, 2013, he was elected as bishop provisional of the Episcopal Church in South Carolina, a diocese of ECUSA which was challenged with reorganization in the wake of Bishop Mark Lawrence's departure from the Episcopal Church.

VonRosenberg referred to the departing followers of Lawrence as "sincere Christians". In describing his own task as the new bishop, vonRosenberg said "I want to use the image of rebuilding, for that is what we are called to do – to reorganize and to rebuild the Episcopal Church in South Carolina." He went on to say that the diocese should rebuild the church on the foundation of Jesus Christ, with an attitude of humility and love. 

On January 14, 2016 VonRosenberg announced his intention to retire as bishop provisional after June 26 when he completes his schedule of visits to the congregations and missions of the diocese.

References

1947 births
Living people
American Episcopalians
Episcopal bishops of South Carolina
People from Fayetteville, North Carolina
University of North Carolina at Chapel Hill alumni
Virginia Theological Seminary alumni
Episcopal bishops of East Tennessee